The 2016–17 NBL season is the 18th season for the basketball team Cairns Taipans in the NBL.

Current squad

Regular season

Standings

Finals 

Cairns Taipans seasons
2016–17 NBL season by team
2016–17 NBL season